Platensina tetrica is a species of tephritid or fruit flies in the genus Platensina of the family Tephritidae.

Distribution
India, Vietnam, West Malaysia.

References

Tephritinae
Insects described in 1939
Diptera of Asia